Northeast Cay, also known as Parola Island (Mandarin), with a land area of , is the fifth largest of the naturally occurring Spratly Islands and the third largest of the Philippine-occupied islands. It is part of the North Danger Reef and is located to the northwest of Dangerous Ground.

The island is also claimed by the People's Republic of China, the Republic of China (Taiwan) and Vietnam.

Environment
Some of the cay's outcrops are visible on its western side. It has high salinity groundwater and vegetation is limited to beach type of plants. The corals around the island were mostly destroyed by dynamite and cyanide fishing methods. It is covered with grass and thick trees. Much of the fringing reef is above water at high tide. It supported a beacon in 1984. It also has guano deposits.

History

In 1933 the French Government decided to take official possession of the Spratly Islands, including Northeast Cay and Southwest Cay. Three ships, the Alerte, the Astrobale and the De Lanessan, took part in the expedition.
"Further north still, at the level of Nhatrang, is the atoll named "North Danger". The Alerte took possession of two sandy islands (cayes) where it found some Japanese fishing. The De Lanessan went there too and explored the little island. The latter is perceptibly higher than the others, the highest point reaching 5 metres. The phosphate beds are considerable and were much exploited by the Japanese."

After possession had been taken, the French Ministry of Foreign Affairs published the following notice:
"Notice concerning the occupation of certain islands by French naval units.
The French government has caused the under mentioned isles and islets to be occupied by French naval units:
Group of two islands situated at latitude 111°29' north and longitude 114°21' east of Greenwich, with their dependent isles (36) (Possession taken April 10, 1933).
The above-mentioned isles and islets henceforward come under French sovereignty. "This notice cancels the previous notice inserted in the Official Journal dated July 25, 1933, page 7784.  French Journal Officiel dated July 26, 1933 (page 7837)."

In 1939 Japan occupied the islands until the end of World War II.

In 1956 the French transferred the islands to South Vietnam.

In 1959 the South Vietnam Government renamed "Song Tử" (meaning twin because the two islands are very similar) with "Tây" (meaning west) and "Đông" (meaning East) to differentiate them. They were annexed to Phuoc Tuy province, South Vietnam.
On 24 May 1963, the sovereignty steles were rebuilt on Song Tu Dong (North East Cay) and Song Tu Tay (South West Cay) by crew members of the three vessels Huong Giang, Chi Lang and Ky Hoa of the South Vietnam.

In 1968, Philippine troops occupied Northeast Cay (Parola Island, Song Tu Dong) and Southwest Cay (Pugad Island, Song Tu Tay).

In 1975, Southwest Cay was reoccupied by South Vietnam (see Southwest Cay incident (1975)) and it was subsequently taken over by the later unified Vietnam. The Philippines continue to occupy Northeast Cay.

Current Status

Northeast Cay is considered by the Philippines as the second top priority for protection, after Thitu Island, since it is very near Vietnamese-occupied Southwest Cay (Pugad Island).  In its diplomatic protest to China over the Whitsun Reef incident of March 22, 2021, the Philippine government reminded its counterparts in Beijing that Parola Island (Northeast Cay), and the other islands are integral part of the archipelago.

Through sports diplomacy, the Philippines hosted a volleyball match and sportsfest on November 10, 2018 between the Philippine and Vietnamese Navies on Northeast Cay.

The Philippine Coast Guard constructed 5 lighthouses in the area, and this includes one on Northeast Cay.

See also
Southwest Cay
Spratly Islands
Kalayaan, Palawan
Policies, activities and history of the Philippines in Spratly Islands

References

External links

Maritime Transparency Initiative Island Tracker

Islands of the Spratly Islands
North Danger Reef
Kalayaan, Palawan